Tyler Robert Cavanaugh (born February 9, 1994) is an American professional basketball player for Žalgiris Kaunas of the Lithuanian Basketball League (LKL) and the EuroLeague. He played college basketball for Wake Forest and George Washington.

College career
Cavanaugh started his college career at Wake Forest University, where he played two seasons from 2012 to 2014. He transferred to George Washington University for his last two seasons, where he played from 2015 to 2017. He was twice named second-team All-Atlantic 10 Conference and in 2016 won the National Invitation Tournament, earning MVP honors. As a senior, Cavanaugh averaged 18.3 points, 8.4 rebounds and 2.0 assists per game.

Professional career

Atlanta Hawks / Erie BayHawks (2017–2018)
On November 5, 2017, after signing a training camp deal and later being waived by the Atlanta Hawks and playing a game for the Erie BayHawks earlier in the season, Cavanaugh signed a two-way contract with Atlanta. He made his NBA debut the same day, collecting a rebound in the Hawks’ win.

On December 18, 2017, the Hawks signed Cavanauagh to a two-year contract after tallying the fourth highest three-point field goal percentage among rookies. Cavanaugh played impressively while most of the team's front-line was out due to injuries. He became the second player to convert his original two-way contract into a full contract (only behind Mike James), as well as the first to receive a multi-year contract after finishing his original contract. He passed his career-highs in points, rebounds, and assists with 16 points, six rebounds, and two assists in a 106–105 loss to the New Orleans Pelicans on November 13, 2017. On December 9, 2017, he scored 14 points, along with 3 three-pointers, in a win over the Orlando Magic. On May 11, 2018, he was waived by the Hawks.

Utah Jazz / Salt Lake City Stars (2018–2019)
On August 1, 2018, the Utah Jazz signed Cavanaugh to a two-way contract. He appeared in 11 NBA games for the Jazz.

Alba Berlin (2019–2020)
On July 21, 2019, Cavanaugh signed with Alba Berlin of the Basketball Bundesliga. He averaged 7.2 points and 3.6 rebounds per game.

Iberostar Tenerife (2020–2021)
On July 17, 2020, Cavanaugh signed with Iberostar Tenerife of the Liga ACB.

Žalgiris Kaunas (2021–present)
On June 15, 2021, Cavanaugh signed a three-year (2+1) contract with Žalgiris Kaunas of the Lithuanian Basketball League (LKL) and the EuroLeague.

Personal life
His father, John Cavanaugh, played basketball at Hamilton College and played professionally overseas.

Career statistics

NBA

Regular season 

|-
| style="text-align:left;"| 
| style="text-align:left;"| Atlanta
| 39 || 1 || 13.3 || .441 || .360 || .810 || 3.3 || .7 || .2 || .1 || 4.7
|-
| style="text-align:left;"| 
| style="text-align:left;"| Utah
| 11 || 0 || 3.5 || .300 || .200 || 1.000 || .7 || .1 || .0 || .0 || .8
|- class="sortbottom"
| style="text-align:center;" colspan="2"| Career
| 50 || 1 || 11.1 || .432 || .351 || .826 || 2.7 || .6 || .2 || .1 || 3.8

EuroLeague

|-
| align="left"|2019–20
| align="left"|ALBA
| 19 || 1 || 14.6 || .370 || .357 || .970 || 3.3 || .9 || .5 || .2 || 6.4 || 6.4
|-
| align="left"|2021–22
| align="left" rowspan=2|Žalgiris
| 30 || 25 || 25.8 || .460 || .378 || .767 || 5.1 || 1.5 || .5 || .2 || 9.7 || 10.0
|-
| align="left"|2022–23
| 14 || 2 || 20.1 || .337 || .326 || .769 || 4.3 || 1.0 || .4 || .1 || 5.9 || 6.0
|- class="sortbottom"
| align="center" colspan=2| Career
| 63 || 28 || 21.1 || .415 || .362 || .855 || 4.4 || 1.2 || .5 || .2 || 7.8 || 8.0

References

External links
EuroLeague profile
RealGM profile
George Washington Colonials bio
Wake Forest Demon Deacons bio

1994 births
Living people
Alba Berlin players
American expatriate basketball people in Germany
American expatriate basketball people in Lithuania
American expatriate basketball people in Spain
American men's basketball players
Basketball players from Syracuse, New York
Atlanta Hawks players
BC Žalgiris players
CB Canarias players
Erie BayHawks (2017–2019) players
George Washington Colonials men's basketball players
Liga ACB players
Power forwards (basketball)
Salt Lake City Stars players
Undrafted National Basketball Association players
Utah Jazz players
Wake Forest Demon Deacons men's basketball players
United States men's national basketball team players